In the geometry of 4 dimensions, the 3-3 duoprism or triangular duoprism is a four-dimensional convex polytope. It can be constructed as the Cartesian product of two triangles and is the simplest of an infinite family of four-dimensional polytopes constructed as Cartesian products of two polygons, the duoprisms.

It has 9 vertices, 18 edges, 15 faces (9 squares, and 6 triangles), in 6 triangular prism cells. It has Coxeter diagram , and symmetry , order 72. Its vertices and edges form a  rook's graph.

Hypervolume 
This is the square of the area of an equilateral triangle, .

Graph
The graph of vertices and edges of the 3-3 duoprism has 9 vertices and 18 edges. Like the Berlekamp–van Lint–Seidel graph and the unknown solution to Conway's 99-graph problem, every edge is part of a unique triangle and every non-adjacent pair of vertices is the diagonal of a unique square. It is a toroidal graph, a locally linear graph, a strongly regular graph with parameters (9,4,1,2), the  rook's graph, and the Paley graph of order 9.
This graph is also the Cayley graph of the group  with generating set .

Images

Symmetry
In 5-dimensions, some uniform 5-polytopes have 3-3 duoprism vertex figures, some with unequal edge-lengths and therefore lower symmetry:

The birectified 16-cell honeycomb also has a 3-3 duoprism vertex figure. There are three constructions for the honeycomb with two lower symmetries.

Related complex polygons

The regular complex polytope 3{4}2, in  has a real representation as a 3-3 duoprism in 4-dimensional space. 3{4}2 has 9 vertices, and 6 3-edges. Its symmetry is 3[4]2, order 18. It also has a lower symmetry construction, or 3{}×3{}, with symmetry 3[2]3, order 9. This is the symmetry if the red and blue 3-edges are considered distinct.

Related polytopes

3-3 duopyramid

The dual of a 3-3 duoprism is called a 3-3 duopyramid or triangular duopyramid. It has 9 tetragonal disphenoid cells, 18 triangular faces, 15 edges, and 6 vertices.

It can be seen in orthogonal projection as a 6-gon circle of vertices, and edges connecting all pairs, just like a 5-simplex seen in projection.
orthogonal projection

Related complex polygon
It has 9 2-edges corresponding to the connecting edges of the 3-3 duopyramid, while the 6 edges connecting the two triangles are not included. It can be seen in a hexagonal projection with 3 sets of colored edges. This arrangement of vertices and edges makes a complete bipartite graph with each vertex from one triangle is connected to every vertex on the other. It is also called a Thomsen graph or 4-cage.

See also
3-4 duoprism
Tesseract (4-4 duoprism)
5-5 duoprism
Convex regular 4-polytope
Duocylinder

Notes

References
Regular Polytopes, H. S. M. Coxeter, Dover Publications, Inc., 1973, New York, p. 124.
 Coxeter, The Beauty of Geometry: Twelve Essays, Dover Publications, 1999,    (Chapter 5: Regular Skew Polyhedra in three and four dimensions and their topological analogues)
 Coxeter, H. S. M. Regular Skew Polyhedra in Three and Four Dimensions. Proc. London Math. Soc. 43, 33-62, 1937.
 John H. Conway, Heidi Burgiel, Chaim Goodman-Strass, The Symmetries of Things 2008,  (Chapter 26)
 Norman Johnson Uniform Polytopes, Manuscript (1991)
 N.W. Johnson: The Theory of Uniform Polytopes and Honeycombs, Ph.D. Dissertation, University of Toronto, 1966
 
 Apollonian Ball Packings and Stacked Polytopes  Discrete & Computational Geometry, June 2016, Volume 55, Issue 4, pp 801–826

External links
The Fourth Dimension Simply Explained—describes duoprisms as "double prisms" and duocylinders as "double cylinders"
Polygloss – glossary of higher-dimensional terms
Exploring Hyperspace with the Geometric Product

4-polytopes